David Gordon Mundell,   (born 27 May 1962) is a Scottish politician and solicitor who served as Secretary of State for Scotland from 2015 to 2019. A member of the Scottish Conservative Party, he has served as the Member of Parliament (MP) for Dumfriesshire, Clydesdale and Tweeddale since 2005. Mundell was the first openly gay Conservative cabinet minister, formally coming out in 2016.

From 1999 to 2005, Mundell served as a Member of the Scottish Parliament (MSP) for the South of Scotland region. He was first elected to the British House of Commons as the MP for Dumfriesshire, Clydesdale and Tweeddale in 2005 and served as Shadow Secretary of State for Scotland from 2005 to 2010 and Under-Secretary of State for Scotland from 2010 to 2015. He served in the Cabinet as Scotland Secretary from 2015 until 2019; the first Conservative to hold the position since Michael Forsyth in 1997.

Background
Born in Dumfries, Mundell grew up in Newton Wamphray and Lockerbie.  He attended Lockerbie Academy before reading Law at the University of Edinburgh (MA), also gaining a Diploma in Legal Practice (Dip LP). After further studies, he graduated from Strathclyde Business School as MBA.

Having become a Young Conservative aged 14, he switched to the Social Democratic Party (SDP) while at university in 1981.  In 2002, he stated: "the first Thatcher Government did get a bit bogged down and it wasn't really the radical government that subsequently emerged,... And the fact that you had a completely new opportunity to wipe the slate clean, with no baggage, was a very attractive thing".

He practised as a solicitor before joining BT as Group Legal Advisor for Scotland in 1991. He became BT Scotland's Head of National Affairs, remaining with BT until being elected as an MSP. Mundell served as an SDP Councillor on Annandale and Eskdale District Council from 1984 to 1986, representing Dryfe ward, and then for Mid Annandale ward on Dumfries and Galloway Regional Council until 1987, whilst still a postgraduate student.

Mundell is a member of the Society of Writers to His Majesty's Signet (WS) and of the Law Society of Scotland.

Parliamentary career

Scottish Parliament
Mundell was elected to the Scottish Parliament in 1999 and 2003 as a list MSP for the South of Scotland.

House of Commons
In the 2005 general election, Mundell was elected as MP for the Dumfriesshire, Clydesdale and Tweeddale constituency. Following his election to Westminster, Mundell resigned from the Scottish Parliament in June 2005. His seat was taken by Derek Brownlee, who was next on the Conservatives' South of Scotland candidate list. As the sole Conservative Scottish parliamentary representative, David Cameron (as Leader of HM Opposition) appointed him Shadow Secretary of State for Scotland in December 2005.

Mundell was among the 18 MPs (either Scottish or representing Scottish constituencies) who supported the Commons Motion stating football "should not be any different from other competing sports and our young talent should be allowed to show their skills on the world stage", thereby endorsing the idea of Team GB entering a British football team in the London 2012 Olympics. Football's governing bodies in Scotland, Wales and Northern Ireland oppose a Great Britain team, fearing it would stop them competing as individual nations in future tournaments.

Mundell represented the Scottish Conservative Party at the three Scottish Leaders' Debates broadcast on ITV1, Sky News and BBC1 during the 2010 general election campaign.

Mundell retained his seat at the 2019 general election with a reduced majority.

On 6 June, Mundell voted no confidence in Prime Minister Johnson.

Government minister
Before the 2010 general election, Mundell served as the Conservative Shadow Scottish Secretary. Following that election, the Conservative Party formed a coalition government with the Liberal Democrats. He held the non-cabinet role of Parliamentary Under-Secretary of State for Scotland, since the office of Secretary of State for Scotland was given to Liberal Democrat MP Danny Alexander (then Michael Moore and Alistair Carmichael), in view of the Liberal Democrats' greater representation of Scottish seats. On 9 June 2010, Mundell was appointed a Privy Counsellor.

Mundell was returned to Parliament at the 2015 general election with a much reduced majority of 798 votes (1.5%), although the Conservative Party's share of the vote increased by 1.8%. He succeeded Liberal Democrat Alistair Carmichael as Secretary of State for Scotland. In the referendum on EU membership of June 2016, Mundell supported Britain remaining within the EU. Following it, he became a part-time member of the cabinet committee working on strategies for Brexit. He was the only Conservative MP to represent a Scottish constituency in the 56th parliament (2015–2017), but was joined by a further twelve in the 2017 snap general election. Following the election of Boris Johnson as Prime Minister, Mundell was sacked from his role and went to the backbenches for the first time since he was elected as an MP.

Constituency issues
In 2015, Mundell opened a food bank in the Dumfries and Galloway constituency, which adjoins his own and was at the time represented by the Scottish National Party's Richard Arkless. After the opening, Mundell was escorted from an angry anti-austerity demonstration by police. Mundell, who had previously denied that welfare reform changes were behind the increased demand for food banks, was accused of hypocrisy by opponents who said the opening was "nothing to celebrate".  Mundell said he was willing to work with all local organisations who wanted to eradicate poverty.

Trade envoy
On 23 August 2021, Boris Johnson appointed Mundell as the UK's trade envoy to New Zealand. On 6 July 2022, he resigned from his position as Trade Envoy following the Chris Pincher scandal, amid the July 2022 United Kingdom government crisis.

Personal life

On 13 January 2016, Mundell publicly came out as gay on his personal website; he is believed to be the first openly gay Conservative cabinet minister. 

His nickname is 'Fluffy'.

He was previously married to Lynda Carmichael but the couple have divorced. He has three children, one of whom, Oliver Mundell, is the Conservative MSP for Dumfriesshire, having won his seat in the Scottish Parliament in May 2016.

See also 
 Scotland Office

References

External links

 David Mundell MP official constituency website
 Debrett's People of Today bio
 David Mundell Conservative Party profile
 David Mundell MP Scottish Conservative Party profile
 Dumfries & Galloway Conservatives
 
 

|-

|-

|-

|-

1962 births
Alumni of the University of Edinburgh School of Law
Alumni of the University of Strathclyde
British solicitors
British Telecom people
Conservative MSPs
Councillors in Dumfries and Galloway
Gay politicians
LGBT members of the Parliament of the United Kingdom
Living people
Members of the Privy Council of the United Kingdom
Members of the Scottish Parliament 1999–2003
Members of the Scottish Parliament 2003–2007
People from Dumfries
Secretaries of State for Scotland
Scottish Conservative Party MPs
Scottish solicitors
Social Democratic Party (UK) politicians
UK MPs 2005–2010
UK MPs 2010–2015
UK MPs 2015–2017
UK MPs 2017–2019
UK MPs 2019–present
LGBT government ministers
LGBT members of the Scottish Parliament
21st-century LGBT people
Scottish LGBT politicians